Castropignano is a comune (municipality) in the Province of Campobasso in the Italian region Molise, located about  northwest of Campobasso.

It is home to a medieval castle, the Castello d'Evoli, built in the mid-fourteenth century, perhaps over the remains of a Samnite fortress.

References
 

Cities and towns in Molise